Sminthurididae is a family of globular springtails in the order Symphypleona. There are about 5 genera and more than 40 described species in Sminthurididae.

Genera
These five genera belong to the family Sminthurididae:
 Boernerides Bretfeld, 1999
 Denisiella Folsom & Mills, 1938
 Sminthurides Boener, 1900
 Sphaeridia Linnaniemi, 1912
 Stenacidia Börner, 1906

References

Further reading

External links

 

Collembola
Articles created by Qbugbot